Ruben Rabasa is an American actor. After appearing in the Netflix show I Think You Should Leave with Tim Robinson, as an elderly focus group participant, he became part of an internet meme.

References

1930s births
Living people
American actors